Panaeolus coprinifacies is a species of mushroom in the family Hymenogastraceae.

See also
List of Psilocybin mushrooms
Psilocybin mushrooms
Psilocybe

References

Entheogens
Psychoactive fungi
coprinifacies
Psychedelic tryptamine carriers
Fungi of North America